Porters Neck is an unincorporated community and census-designated place in New Hanover County, North Carolina, United States. Its population was 6,204 as of the 2010 census.

History
William B. Gould was enslaved on Nicholas Nixon's plantation on Porters Neck before escaping in 1862.

Geography

Demographics

References

Unincorporated communities in New Hanover County, North Carolina
Unincorporated communities in North Carolina
Census-designated places in New Hanover County, North Carolina
Census-designated places in North Carolina